DXRS may refer to:
 DXRS-AM, a former AM radio station broadcasting in Surigao City, branded as RMN Surigao from 1970 to 2022 and relaunched as iFm 94.1 Surigao
 DXRS-FM, an FM radio station broadcasting in Gingoog, branded as Radyo Natin